Wang Jiusi 王九思 (1468-1551) was a Chinese official, writer and satirical playwright from Shaanxi, one of the Former Seven Masters. He was a friend of Kang Hai, also from Shaanxi, and the pair were banished from the Ming court after being identified as belonging to Liu Jin's political faction.

His most famous zaju was a one-act adaptation of the folktale of the Wolf of Zhongshan.

Works
 Zhongshan lang yuanben (The farce on the Wolf of Mount Zhong)
 Du Zimei gujiu youchun ji (Du Fu Buys Wine and Roams in the Spring)

References

1468 births
1551 deaths
16th-century Chinese dramatists and playwrights
15th-century Chinese dramatists and playwrights